Aleksandra Grigoryeva (née Deverinskaya; ; born 19 March 1960) is a Russian former racewalking athlete. She was the gold medallist at the 1985 Summer Universiade, becoming the inaugural women's walk champion at the event. She represented the Soviet Union at the 1986 European Athletics Championships.

She was twice a medallist at the IAAF World Race Walking Cup, taking silver in 1981 and sharing the bronze with teammate Olga Krishtop in 1985. She was also a bronze medallist at the 1986 Goodwill Games. She won at the Soviet Athletics Championships in 1981, taking the 5000 m walk title.

She is a former world record holder for the 5000 metres race walk, having set a time of 22:30.0 minutes in Moscow on 2 May 1982.

International competitions

National titles
Soviet Athletics Championships
5000 m walk: 1981

References

External links
Portrait

Living people
1960 births
Russian female racewalkers
Soviet female racewalkers
World record setters in athletics (track and field)
Universiade medalists in athletics (track and field)
Goodwill Games medalists in athletics
Universiade gold medalists for the Soviet Union
Medalists at the 1985 Summer Universiade
Competitors at the 1986 Goodwill Games
20th-century Russian women